Durand of the Bad Lands is a 1925 American silent Western film directed by Lynn Reynolds and starring Buck Jones, Marian Nixon, and Malcolm Waite. It is a remake of the 1917 film of the same title.

Plot
Pete Garson, a henchman of Sheriff Clem Allison, commits various crimes under the guise of former rancher Dick Durand. The latter, hearing about the situation, returns from Mexico to clear his name. There, Dick meets and falls in love with Molly Gore, who initially spurns his attention. However, after performing a series of good deeds that finally establishes his innocence, her attitude softens and, in the end, she returns his love.

Cast

Preservation
With no prints of Durand of the Bad Lands located in any film archives, it is a lost film.

See also
 1937 Fox vault fire

References

Bibliography
 Solomon, Aubrey. The Fox Film Corporation, 1915-1935: A History and Filmography. McFarland, 2011.

External links

 

1925 films
1925 Western (genre) films
Films directed by Lynn Reynolds
Fox Film films
American black-and-white films
Lost American films
1925 lost films
Lost Western (genre) films
Silent American Western (genre) films
1920s English-language films
1920s American films